Five regiments of the British Army have been numbered the 103th Regiment of Foot:

103rd Regiment of Foot (Volunteer Hunters), raised in 1760
103rd Regiment of Foot (King's Irish Infantry), raised in 1782
103rd Regiment of Foot (1794), raised in 1794
103rd Regiment of Foot (1806), formed from garrison units in 1808
103rd Regiment of Foot (Royal Bombay Fusiliers) was raised by the East India Company and placed on the British establishment as the 103rd Foot in 1862.